The Hull Seamen's Union was a trade union representing sailors based in Kingston-upon-Hull, in England.

The union was founded in 1883 as the Hull Sailors' Mutual Association, and in 1887 it renamed itself as the Hull Seamen's and Marine Firemen's Association.  In 1913, it changed its name to the "Hull Seamen's Union".

The union represented the majority of organised sailors in Hull, and the largest of the local seamen's unions in the United Kingdom.  It was led by James Benjamin Butcher, who focused on maintaining good relations with shipowners, and was described by rival John R. Bell as "out of date and out of sympathy with all progressive movements".

In 1922, the union merged into the National Sailors' and Firemen's Union.

General Secretaries
1880s: James Benjamin Butcher
c.1913: George William McKee

References

Seafarers' trade unions
Trade unions established in 1883
Trade unions disestablished in 1922
Trade unions in the United Kingdom
Trade unions based in the East Riding of Yorkshire